"Haven't Seen It Yet" is a song by American contemporary Christian music singer and songwriter Danny Gokey. It is the lead single from his sixth studio album, of the same name.

Background
Gokey spoke about the inspiration for the song "It's for people dealing with disappointment, which often makes people do a lot of things they don't want to do. I was a widower and now I'm married again, but there are many who try to escape the pain of losing a spouse by doing bad things like drugs. So this song is for those people -- not just widows and widowers -- to give them hope. If you've been praying for a long time and haven't found the answer, you're gonna need to look at all the good things that God has done. What you feel now many not be the truest, and God is not finished with you yet. The best is yet to come. It's a song of comfort, hope and to keep people pushing through the dark times."

Composition
"Haven't Seen It Yet" is originally in the key of D Major, with a tempo of 70 beats per minute. Written in common time, Gokey's vocal range spans from A5 to B3 during the song.

Critical reception

Tony Cummings for Cross Rhythms wrote "Haven't Seen It Yet is a beautifully crafted mid-tempo song which is truly faith-building. Danny sings it like he believes every word."

Commercial performance
On June 29, 2019, "Haven't Seen It Yet" peaked at No. 1 on the Billboard Christian Airplay chart, his fourth No. 1. The song has spent three weeks at No. 1 and 30 weeks on the chart altogether. It became his second highest peaking song on the Christian Songs chart, peaking at No. 3.

Music video
A music video for the single "Haven't Seen It Yet" was released on February 1, 2019 starring Danny Gokey, Chopper Bernet, Chelsea Jordan, and Helena Claussen. The video has over fourteen million views on YouTube.

Accolades

Charts

Weekly charts

Year-end charts

Certifications

Release history

References

2019 songs
2019 singles
Danny Gokey songs
Gospel songs
American pop songs
Contemporary Christian songs
Sparrow Records singles
Songs written by Ethan Hulse